Jonathan Lalrinchhana (born 12 February 1986) is an Indian cricketer. He made his List A debut on 27 February 2021, for Mizoram in the 2020–21 Vijay Hazare Trophy.

References

External links
 

1986 births
Living people
Indian cricketers
Mizoram cricketers
Place of birth missing (living people)